In theoretical physics, the Fayet–Iliopoulos D-term (introduced by Pierre Fayet and John Iliopoulos) is a D-term in a supersymmetric theory obtained from a vector superfield V simply by an integral over all of superspace:
 
Because a natural trace must be a part of the expression, the action only exists for U(1) vector superfields. 

References
 

Supersymmetric quantum field theory